The 2010 WAFL season was the 126th season of the West Australian Football League in its various incarnations. It was notable for the end of the 2000s Subiaco dynasty, with the Lions missing out on the finals for the first time since 1997 and also witnessed reigning premiers South Fremantle dropping to be ahead of only perennial stragglers Peel and Perth, who continued their disastrous record of the 2000s - Peel avoided the wooden spoon with three wins but recorded the second worst average points against in WAFL history behind only Perth in 1981. In contrast, Claremont, who had not won a premiership since 1996 and had been second last in both 2008 and 2009, rose to the top with only one loss and a draw until the closing home-and-away round, whilst Swan Districts, after suffering through severe financial difficulties and a long run of poor results on the field, ultimately won its eighth senior premiership in a thrilling Grand Final.

Home-and-away season

Round 1

Round 2

Round 3 (Easter weekend)

Round 4

Round 5

Round 6 (Anzac Day)

Round 7

Round 8

Round 9

Round 10

Round 11 (Foundation Day)

Round 12

Round 13

Round 14

Round 15

Round 16

Round 17

Round 18

Round 19

Round 20

Round 21

Round 22

Round 23

Ladder

Finals

First semi-final

Second semi-final

Preliminary final

Grand Final

References

External links
Official WAFL website
West Australian Football League Season 2010

West Australian Football League seasons
WAFL